Moussey may refer to the following places in France:

 Moussey, Aube, a commune in the Aube department
 Moussey, Moselle, a commune in the Moselle department
 Moussey, Vosges, a commune in the Vosges department